The Beardmore Tornado was an eight-cylinder inline diesel aircraft engine built in 1927 by William Beardmore and Company of Glasgow, Scotland, and used in the British R101 airship when petrol engines were thought unsafe in the tropics. The model is given as Tornado IIIA or Tornado III C.I.  The fuel is described as Diesel heavy-oil.

Design and development
The engine was designed by combining two four-cylinder units used for railcars into the eight-cylinder (MkI) engine. At 17 tons for the five, they were six tons above design weight. The weight with the power car was over three tons per engine. The big end bearings were also found to be prone to early failure,  In addition, there were two critical vibration frequencies which coincided with idling and cruising speeds, resulting in a limitation on the maximum rpm and consequently a reduction in power output.

The Tornado had steam cooling; water in the cylinder jackets was allowed to come to boiling point, and then condensed in three small triangular radiators on the hull above the power cars, or for the two midships engines was condensed in a retractable radiator and used to heat the passenger accommodation. Running the engines at a relatively high thermal temperature was expected to improve the specific fuel consumption. The Tornado engines used Ricardo petrol starting engines, and there had only been time to replace one with a Beverley heavy-oil starting engine (itself started by compressed air) on one Tornado.

The engines were intended to have reversing propellers, but they failed. At one point during development of R101, one engine was used only for astern running at the start and finish of flights, a decision that astonished Nevil Shute and the other engineers on the R100 team.  Later two engines were made reversible by an adjustment to the camshaft.

The R101 had five Tornado engines. The proposed R102 airship was to have seven engines of an improved version of the Tornado, having an output of 850 bhp (630 kW, maximum) or 700 bhp (520 kW, cruising, continuous), but the project was cancelled in 1931 after the crash of the R101 and the end of the Imperial Airship Scheme.
The R100 would have used the Tornado, but petrol engines were chosen to avoid delays.

Specifications (Tornado III) 

{{pistonspecs
|

|type= 8-cylinder liquid-cooled inline upright layout engine
|ref=Masefield:<ref> Masefield; page 494</ref> 
|bore= 8.25 inches  (210 mm)
|stroke= 12.0 inches (304.8 mm)
|displacement= 5,130.8 in3 (84.125 L)
|length=
|diameter=
|width=
|height=
|weight= 4,733 lb (2150 kg) bare engine, 8,580 lb (3890 kg) installed
|valvetrain=
|supercharger=
|turbocharger=
|fuelsystem=
|fueltype=Diesel heavy-oil
|oilsystem=
|coolingsystem=Water/steam cooling (see above) 
|power=650 bhp (480 kW) at 935 rpm maximum; 475 bhp (350 kW) at 825 rpm cruise
|specpower=
|compression=12.25:1
|fuelcon= 279 lb/hr (127 kg·h−1) maximum; 200 lb/hr (92 kg·h−1) cruise
|specfuelcon= 0.429 lb/bhp/hr (261 g·kW−1·h−1) maximum, 0.421 lb/bhp/hr (256 g·kW−1·h−1) cruise
|oilcon=
|power/weight=
}}

References

Further reading
 Gunston, Bill. World Encyclopedia of Aero Engines. Cambridge, England. Patrick Stephens Limited, 1989. 
 Gunston, Bill. Development of Piston Aero Engines. Cambridge, England. Patrick Stephens Limited, 2006. 
 Lumsden, Alec. British Piston Engines and their Aircraft''. Marlborough, Wiltshire: Airlife Publishing, 2003. .
 Mac Kay, Charles, "Beardmore Aviation 1913 - 1930" A.MacKay 2012

External links

Beardmore rail rolling stock and Tornado engine
Flight magazine on the Tornado engine 1929

Aircraft diesel engines
Tornado
1920s aircraft piston engines
Airship engines